Yee Moh Chai is a Malaysian politician from PBS. He was the Member of Parliament for Tanjong Aru from 1995 to 2004, and for Kota Kinabalu from 2004 to 2008, and was the Member of Sabah State Legislative Assembly for Api-Api from 1994 to 2013.

Early career 
He started his career as a doctor. After that, he worked as a lawyer in Dr. Yee & Associates until he was appointed into the Sabah Cabinet.

Politics 
Yee is currently the Deputy President of PBS.

Yee made his election debut in the 1994 Sabah state election for the Likas state seat but lost to the President of SAPP, Yong Teck Lee. In the 1995 Malaysian general election, he competed for the Tanjong Aru federal seat and was successful to defeat the incumbent, Joseph Voon. He then changed to compete for the Api-Api state seat in the 1999 Sabah state election.

Yee was appointed as the Sabah Minister of Resources and Information Technology Development after to 2004 Sabah state election and was able to secure his post after the 2008 Sabah state election.

Election result

Honours 
  :
  Commander of the Order of Kinabalu (PGDK) - Datuk (2004)
  Grand Commander of the Order of Kinabalu (SPDK) - Datuk Seri Panglima (2021)

References 

20th-century Malaysian politicians
21st-century Malaysian politicians
Place of birth missing (living people)
Malaysian Chinese Association politicians
United Sabah Party politicians
Members of the Dewan Rakyat
Members of the Sabah State Legislative Assembly
Malaysian people of Chinese descent
Malaysian politicians of Chinese descent
Living people
1955 births
Grand Commanders of the Order of Kinabalu
Commanders of the Order of Kinabalu